Aghbolagh  (also Romanized as Āghbloāgh and Agh Bolagh; also known as Agbulag, Āgh Bolāgh-e ‘Olyā, Āqbolāgh, Āq Bolāgh, Āq Bolāgh-e Bālā, Āqbolāgh-e ‘Olyā, Āq Bulāgh, and Bāgh Bolāgh-e Bālā) is a village in Sina Rural District, in the Central District of Varzaqan County, East Azerbaijan Province, Iran. At the 2006 census, its population was 125, in 28 families.

References 

Towns and villages in Varzaqan County